Isola della Scala is a comune (municipality) of c. 10,000 inhabitants in the Province of Verona in the Italian region of Veneto, located about  west of Venice and about  southeast of Verona.

Isola della Scala borders the following municipalities: Bovolone, Buttapietra, Erbè, Nogara, Oppeano, Salizzole, Trevenzuolo, and Vigasio.

Twin towns
 Eaubonne, France
 Budenheim, Germany

Born
 Eros Poli (6 August 1963), cyclist
 Nicola Minali (10 November 1969), cyclist
 Alberto Pomini (17 March 1981), footballer
 Riccardo Meggiorini (4 September 1985), footballer
 Elia Viviani (7 February 1989), cyclist

References

External links
 Official website

Cities and towns in Veneto